I Want You Near Me is a song by recording artist Tina Turner from her 1991 compilation album, Simply the Best, on which it was one of four new recordings. This single, written by Terry Britten and Graham Lyle, and produced by the former, peaked at number 22 in the United Kingdom.

Charts

References

Tina Turner songs
1992 singles
Songs written by Graham Lyle
Songs written by Terry Britten
1991 songs
Capitol Records singles